Aulonocara stonemani is a species of haplochromine cichlid. It is endemic to the southeastern and southwestern arms of Lake Malawi.

Aulonocara stonemani is found in deep waters, over a substrate consisting of mud or sand with sediment layer. Its diet consists of feeds on small invertebrates sifted from the sediment. It is not considered a threatened species by the IUCN.

The specific name honours the Chief Fisheries Officer for Malawi, J. Stoneman, who helped ensure the success of the expedition the type was collected on.

References

Fish of Malawi
stonemani
Fish described in 1973
Taxonomy articles created by Polbot
Fish of Lake Malawi